Like is a word in English with a number of common uses.

Like or likes may also refer to:

Computing and Internet
 Like button, a feature of social-networking websites such as Facebook, YouTube, or blogs
 Like.com, a price-comparison service website
 Like (SQL), a keyword in SQL
 LIKE, a short video sharing platform

Places
 Like, Tampere, a shopping centre in Lielahti, Tampere, Finland
 Like, Srebrenik, a village in Bosnia and Herzegovina

Products
 Like Cola, an unsuccessful cola soft drink
 Mitsuoka Like, an automobile
 Like, a model of motor scooter by Taiwanese manufacturer Kymco

Other
 Likay (rendered as like), a form of Thai folk theatre
 Like (novel), a 1997 novel by Ali Smith
 Like (TV series), a Mexican telenovela
 Like, Srebrenik, a village in Bosnia and Herzegovina
 The Like, a rock band
 Like (producer), a member of hip hop trio Pac Div
 Likes..., a 2004 album by Dani Siciliano
 "Like", a song by Taproot from the album Welcome
 "Likes", a song by Yuna and Kyle from the album Rouge

See also
Liking (disambiguation)